Sowan (Îlot Sowan) is a small, uninhabited island in the Malampa Province of Vanuatu.

Geography
Sowan is located 4.5 km from Lakatoro on Malekula Island. Sowan is a long sandbar with some vegetation.  The estimated elevation of the terrain above sea level is about 177 metres. It's a favourite haunt of wild ducks.

References

Uninhabited islands of Vanuatu
Malampa Province